This is the results breakdown of the local elections held in the Community of Madrid on 26 May 2019. The following tables show detailed results in the autonomous community's most populous municipalities, sorted alphabetically.

Opinion polls

City control
The following table lists party control in the most populous municipalities, including provincial capitals (shown in bold). Gains for a party are displayed with the cell's background shaded in that party's colour.

Municipalities

Alcalá de Henares
Population: 193,751

Alcobendas
Population: 116,037

Alcorcón
Population: 169,502

Coslada
Population: 81,860

Fuenlabrada
Population: 193,586

Getafe
Population: 180,747

Leganés
Population: 188,425

Madrid

Population: 3,223,334

Móstoles
Population: 207,095

Parla
Population: 128,256

Torrejón de Ardoz
Population: 129,729

See also
2019 Madrilenian regional election

References

Madrid
2019